Tear Drop City  is a single by The Monkees released on February 8, 1969 on Colgems #5000 recorded on October 26, 1966. The song reached No.56 on the Billboard chart, no.37 on cash box. The lyrics are about a man who feels low because his girlfriend has left him. Written by Tommy Boyce and Bobby Hart, it was the first single The Monkees released as a trio (Micky Dolenz, Michael Nesmith, and Davy Jones; Peter Tork departed December 1968). Micky Dolenz performed the lead vocal. Boyce and Hart produced and arranged the song.

The flip-side was "A Man Without a Dream", with Davy Jones doing the lead vocal, and it hit no.127 on the Cash Box chart.
Both single sides were from the album Instant Replay.

References

 Joel Whitburn's Billboard Top Pop Singles
 Instant Replay, Rhino CD booklet

1969 singles
The Monkees songs
Songs written by Bobby Hart
Songs written by Tommy Boyce
1969 songs